The London Wall was a defensive wall first built by the Romans around the strategically important port town of Londinium in  AD 200, and is now the name of a modern street in the City of London. 

London was, from around 120-150, protected by a large fort, with a large garrison, that stood to its north-western side. The fort, now referred to as the Cripplegate Fort was later incorporated into a comprehensive city wide defence, with its strengthened northern and western sides becoming part of the Wall which was built around 200. The incorporation of the fort's walls gave the walled area its distinctive shape in the north-west part of the city. 

The end of Roman rule in Britain, around 410, led to the wall falling into disrepair. It was restored in the late Anglo-Saxon period, a process generally thought to have begun under Alfred the Great after 886. Repairs and enhancements continued throughout the medieval period. The wall largely defined the boundaries of the City of London until the later Middle Ages, when population rises and the development of towns around the city blurred the perimeter.

From the 18th century onward, the expansion of the City of London saw large parts of the wall demolished, including its city gates, to improve traffic flow. Since the Second World War, conservation efforts have helped to preserve surviving sections of the city wall as scheduled monuments.

Like most other city walls around England, the London Wall has been largely lost, though a number of fragments remain (see interactive map). The long presence of these walls had had a profound and continuing effect of the character of the City of London, and surrounding areas. The walls constrained the growth of the city, and the location of the limited number of gates and the route of the roads through them shaped development within the walls, and more fundamentally, beyond them. With few exceptions, the modern roads heading into the former walled area are the same as those which passed through the former medieval gates.
 See this map in big, interactive, with illustrations and more

History

Roman London Wall

It has origins as an initial mound wall and ditch from  AD 100 and a fort, now called Cripplegate fort after the city gate (Cripplegate) that was subsequently built on its northern wall later on, built in 120–150 

The fort was later incorporated into a city wide defence in the late 2nd or early 3rd century AD, though the reason for such a large and expensive public works is unknown. The Fort's north and west walls were thickened and doubled in height to form part of the new city wall. The incorporation of the fort's walls gave the walled area its distinctive shape in the north-west part of the city.

It continued to be developed until at least the end of the 4th century, making it among the last major building projects undertaken by the Romans before the Roman departure from Britain in 410. Reasons for its construction may have been connected to the invasion of northern Britain by Picts who overran Hadrian's Wall in the 180s. This may be linked to the political crisis that emerged in the late 2nd century when the governor of Britain Clodius Albinus was consolidating his power after claiming the right of succession as Roman emperor. After a struggle with his rival Septimius Severus, Albinus was defeated in 197 at the Battle of Lugdunum (near Lyon, France). The economic stimulus provided by the wall and Septimius's subsequent campaigns in Scotland improved Londinium's financial prosperity in the early 3rd century.

Roman London wall characteristics
The wall's gateways coincided with their alignment to the British network of Roman roads. The original gates, clockwise from Ludgate in the west to Aldgate in the east, were: Ludgate, Newgate, Cripplegate, Bishopsgate and Aldgate. Aldersgate, between Newgate and Cripplegate, was added around 350. (Moorgate, initially just a postern, was built later still, in the medieval period).

The length and size of the wall made it one of the biggest construction projects in Roman Britain. It had gateways, towers and defensive ditches, and was built from Kentish ragstone, which was brought by barge from quarries near Maidstone.

Roman Thamesside wall
Excavation work has traced a significant development of 300 metres of timber-framed waterfronts to the east and west of the modern site of London Bridge, with a piece of wooden bridge found at the end of Fish Street Hill. The constructions advancing around 35 metres into the River Thames took place between the late 1st and mid-3rd centuries, highlighting that between these periods no wall stood against the river.

After Londinium was raided on several occasions by Saxon pirates in the late 3rd century, construction of an additional riverside wall, built in phases, began in 280 and was repaired  390. The existence of this riverside section was long doubted due to a lack of evidence, but excavations at the Tower of London in 1977 showed that the section of the inner curtain wall between the Lanthorne and Wakefield Towers, to the south of the White Tower, was originally the eastern part of the Roman riverside wall that was built or rebuilt in the late 4th century. The riverside wall may have limited access to the Thames, both commercial and otherwise, so it may have reflected a diminished level of activity within the city.

It is not clear how long the riverside wall survived, but there are references to a part of it near the dock of Queenhithe, in two charters of 889 and 898. There is currently no evidence of post-Roman restoration, so surviving sections are not likely to have been part, or an important part, of defences much after the Roman period.

Post-Roman disrepair
The end of End of Roman rule in Britain in  410, caused the wall to slowly fall into disrepair, though the survival of Romano-British culture in the area is indicated by the settlement at nearby St Martin-in-the-Fields area of Westminster which persisted until around 450. 

The Anglo-Saxon Chronicle notes that the Romano-British retreated back to London after their bloody defeat at the Battle of Crecganford (Crayford, Kent) at the hands of Hengist and Horsa, leaders of the Saxon invaders, in 457. This suggests that London's wall's retained some military value, although the Anglo-Saxon Chronicle was written many centuries after the Battle of Crayford took place, if it took place at all.

Anglo-Saxon London Wall

Anglo-Saxon city revival

From  500, an Anglo-Saxon settlement known as Lundenwic developed in the same area slightly to the west of the abandoned Roman city, in the vicinity of the Strand. 

In 886 the King of Wessex, Alfred the Great, formally agreed to the terms of the Danish warlord, Guthrum, concerning the area of political and geographical control that had been acquired by the incursion of the Vikings. Within the eastern and northern part of England, with its boundary roughly stretching from London to Chester, the Scandinavians would establish Danelaw.

Anglo-Saxon London Wall restoration
In the same year, the Anglo-Saxon Chronicle recorded that London was "refounded" by Alfred. Archaeological research shows that this involved abandonment of Lundenwic and a revival of life and trade within the old Roman walls. This was part Alfred's policy of building an in-depth defence of the Kingdom of Wessex against the Vikings as well as creating an offensive strategy against the Vikings who controlled Mercia. The burh of Southwark was also created on the south bank of the River Thames during this time.

The city walls of London were repaired as the city slowly grew until about 950 when urban activity increased dramatically. A large Viking army that attacked the London burgh was defeated in 994.

Medieval London Wall

By the 11th century, London was beyond all comparison the largest town in England. Westminster Abbey, rebuilt in the Romanesque style by King Edward the Confessor, was one of the grandest churches in Europe. Winchester had previously been the capital of Anglo-Saxon England, but from this time on, London was the main forum for foreign traders and the base for defence in time of war. In the view of Frank Stenton: "It had the resources, and it was rapidly developing the dignity and the political self-consciousness appropriate to a national capital."

Medieval London Wall restoration
The size and importance of London led to the redevelopment of the city's defences. During the early medieval period – following the Norman Conquest of England – the walls underwent substantial work that included crenellations, additional gates and further towers and bastions. Aside from the seven City Wall gates and the four bars, there are the 13 water-gates on the Thames where goods were unloaded from ships. These include Billingsgate and Bridge Gate. Additionally there were pedestrian-only gates such as the Tower Hill Postern at Tower Hill.

A further medieval defensive feature was the restoration of the defensive ditch immediately adjacent to the outside of the wall. The street name Houndsditch recalls a part of this former feature. This seems to have been re-cut in 1213, with the restored ditch being V-cut to a depth of 6 feet and a width of between 9 and 15 feet.

The re-cut of the ditch may have diverted some of the waters of the Walbrook which would otherwise have flowed through the city, and the wall itself does appear to have acted like a dam, partially obstructing the Walbrook and leading to the marshy conditions at the open space of Moorfields, just north of the wall.

As London continued to grow throughout the medieval period, urban development grew beyond the city walls. This expansion led to the suffix words "Without" and "Within" which denote whether an area of the City – and usually applied to the wards – fell outside or within the London Wall, though only Farringdon and (formerly) Bridge were split into separate wards this way (Bridge Without falling beyond the gates on London Bridge). Some wards – Aldersgate, Bishopsgate and Cripplegate – cover an area that was both within and outside the wall; although not split into separate wards, often the part (or "division") within the Wall is denoted (on maps, in documents, etc.) as being "within" and the part outside the Wall as being "without". Archaically infra (within) and extra (without) were also used and the terms "intramural" and "extramural" are also used to describe being within or outside the walled part of the city.

The suffix is applied to some churches and parishes near the city gateways, such as St Audoen within Newgate and St Botolph-without-Bishopsgate.

Blackfriars extension
Edward I gave the Dominican Friars (or Black Friars) permission to demolish and re-route the section of City wall between Ludgate and the Thames. The did this in stages between 1284 and 1320, extending the walled area as far as the River Fleet so that it enclosed their precinct. The westward extension is likely to have improved the defensibility of Ludgate.

The Wall and the developed area 

In the medieval period the developed area of the city was largely confined to the City Wall, but there was extramural development, especially in the large western ward of Farringdon Without. The wall provided security but was a constraint to accessibility and growth. The extent of the city's jurisdiction has changed little from 1000 to the modern day; but the extramural parts were long home to only a few people. A notable late change to the boundary appears to be that Stow's Survey of London suggests that the part of Moorfields next to the wall was still, in 1603, outside the city's jurisdiction.
 
The boundary of the city's jurisdiction was marked by "city bars", toll gates which were situated just beyond the old walled area; Holborn Bar, Temple Bar, West Smithfield Bar, and Whitechapel Bar. These were the important entrances to the city and their control was vital in maintaining the city's special privileges over certain trades.

Great Fire of London 
During the Great Fire of London in September 1666, almost all of the medieval City of London inside the wall was destroyed, but the wall and gates survived.

Demolition
The seven gates to the City of London, with many repairs and rebuilding over the years, stood until they were all demolished between 1760 and 1767. Work to demolish the walls continued into the 19th century; however, large sections of the wall were incorporated into other structures.

20th century London Wall

Second World War

London Blitz 
The Blitz during the Second World War, through the sheer scale of bombing and destruction of buildings and the surrounding landscape, revealed numerous parts of the London Wall.

At 00:15 on 28 August 1940, during the pre-wave of bombing before the London Blitz, buildings and parts of the wall were destroyed between Fore Street and St. Alphage's churchyard Gardens around Cripplegate. This revealed parts of the wall unseen for over 300 years as the rubble of buildings destroyed around it were removed.

On 29 December 1940, heavy bombing led to conditions known as the Second Great Fire of London. Bomb damage revealed a section of wall at Noble Street, near the Museum of London.

Post-war loss 
In 1957, a 64-metre section of the wall was uncovered during works on the London Wall road, the section was then destroyed to accommodate the road changes and to make way for a new car park. An 11-metre section has been preserved.

Conservation and heritage efforts 
In 1984, the Museum of London set up a Wall Walk from the Tower of London to the museum, using 23 tiled panels. A number of these have been destroyed in subsequent years. At Noble Street, the panels were replaced by etched glass panels. These were intended as a prototype for new panels along the entire walk, but no further replacements have been made. One of the largest and most readily accessed fragments of the wall stands just outside Tower Hill tube station, with a replica statue of the Emperor Trajan standing in front of it. There is a further surviving section preserved in the basement of the One America Square building. There are further remains in the basement of the Old Bailey.

Impact on current city 

The layout of the Roman and medieval walls have had a profound effect on the development of London, even down to the present day. The walls constrained the growth of the city, and the location of the limited number of gates and the route of the roads through them shaped development within the walls, and in a much more fundamental way, beyond them. With a few exceptions, the parts of the modern road network heading into the former walled area are the same as those which passed through the former medieval gates.

Part of the route originally taken by the northern wall is commemorated, although now only loosely followed, by the road also named London Wall. The modern road starts in the west with the Rotunda junction at Aldersgate, then runs east past Moorgate, from which point it runs parallel to the line of the City Wall, and eventually becomes Wormwood Street before it reaches Bishopsgate. This alignment, however, is the result of rebuilding between 1957 and 1976. Before this, London Wall was narrower, and ran behind the line of the City Wall for its entire length, from Wormwood Street to Wood Street. The western section is now St Alphage Garden.

Course

Eastern wall section

Tower of London 

The eastern section of the wall starts in what is now the Tower of London. Within the grounds of the Tower remains of the eastern most wall can still be seen along with a line in the paths heading North within the Tower grounds to outline where it used to run before most of it was demolished to expand the fortification of the Tower. This followed on with a junction at the Tower of London's moat to the Tower Hill Postern, Gate 1, a medieval fortified entrance. The foundation to this entrance can still be seen today within the Tower Hill pedestrian subway. Other large sections of the wall can also be seen further ahead within the Tower Hill gardens.

Aldgate 

The wall from Tower Hill then runs east of Walbrook toward the second historic gate, Aldgate – Gate 2. These would have led onto the Roman road network toward Essex and East Anglia via Stratford and Colchester. In present times, the roads Leadenhall and Fenchurch Street lead into Aldgate High Street where the gate's foundations are buried roughly where the Jewry Street intersects. Following the wall North, it runs between what is now The Aldgate School and Aldgate Square.

Bishopsgate 
From Aldgate, the wall then ran North-West toward Gate 3, Bishopsgate. The road through this would have led onto the Roman road network toward leading to Lincoln and York. The current road, the A10 going north, now goes over the foundations of this gate.

Northern wall section

Moorgate 
From Bishopsgate going along the northern section of wall leads to Gate 4; Moorgate. Until 1415 this was a small postern leading onto marshy Moorfields area of Finsbury. The wet conditions were probably caused by the wall partially obstructing the flow of the Walbrook. Moorgate remained ill-connected with no direct approach road from the south until 1846, some time after the wall had been demolished. London Wall, the modern road following this section of the wall, now crosses this gate's foundations. Leading from here north are routes into Finsbury.

Cripplegate 
Route to the London Charterhouse, Clerkenwell and Islington.

Aldersgate 
With direct access to more local routes.

Western wall section

Newgate 
High Holborn and Oxford Street, with access via the Devil's Highway to Silchester and Bath, and Watling Street to St Albans and the west midlands. These roads leading over the River Fleet.

Ludgate 
Fleet Street and the Strand

Characteristics

Bastions 
The bastions, a tower built against the face of the city wall, are scattered irregularly across its perimeter. Not bonded to the city wall itself, they are considered to be added after the construction of the wall and even later after by post-Roman builders.

21 bastions are currently known about (more may be undiscovered) that can be grouped into an eastern section from the Tower of London to Bishopsgate (B1 - 10), a single bastion west of Bishopsgate (B11), and a western section (B12 – 21). Between the eastern and western section, a gap of 731 metres (2400 feet or 800 yards) along the northern section of the city wall has no recorded bastions.

Known monuments and landmarks

Related signage

See also 
 Fortifications of London
 List of cities with defensive walls
 List of town walls in England and Wales
 Scheduled monuments in Greater London

References

External links 

 PhotoEssay on London Walls with markers
 Map of London Wall Walk and Photos
Interactive map of the London Wall

2nd-century fortifications
City walls in the United Kingdom
English Heritage sites in London
Fortifications of London
Grade I listed buildings in the City of London
History of the City of London
 
Roman London
Roman walls in England
Ruins in London
Streets in the City of London
Walls in England